Yasuto Sekishima is a Japanese mixed martial artist. He competed in the Welterweight division. He was the inaugural Shooto Middleweight Champion. 

Sekishima trained under Satoru Sayama at the Super Tiger Gym. He was originally a judoka and also trained in shootboxing under Caesar Takeshi and combat wrestling under Noriaki Kiguchi and debuted as an amateur before Shooto's professional years. He would debut as a professional in 1989 to a draw to Mitsuo Fujikura.

Championships and Accomplishments
Shooto
Shooto Middleweight Championship (One time)
One successful title defense

Mixed martial arts record

|-
| Draw
| align=center| 7-2-4
| Yuji Ito
| Draw
| Shooto - Shooto
| 
| align=center| 5
| align=center| 3:00
| Tokyo, Japan
| 
|-
| Win
| align=center| 7-2-3
| Kazuhiro Kusayanagi
| Decision (unanimous)
| Shooto - Shooto
| 
| align=center| 5
| align=center| 3:00
| Tokyo, Japan
| 
|-
| Loss
| align=center| 6-2-3
| Naoki Sakurada
| Decision (majority)
| Shooto - Shooto
| 
| align=center| 5
| align=center| 3:00
| Osaka, Japan
| 
|-
| Loss
| align=center| 6-1-3
| Yoshimasa Ishikawa
| Decision (unanimous)
| Shooto - Shooto
| 
| align=center| 5
| align=center| 3:00
| Tokyo, Japan
| 
|-
| Win
| align=center| 6-0-3
| Takashi Tojo
| Submission (armbar)
| Shooto - Shooto
| 
| align=center| 2
| align=center| 0:00
| Tokyo, Japan
| 
|-
| Win
| align=center| 5-0-3
| Manabu Yamada
| KO (punch)
| Shooto - Shooto
| 
| align=center| 2
| align=center| 0:00
| Tokyo, Japan
| 
|-
| Draw
| align=center| 4-0-3
| Naoki Sakurada
| Draw
| Shooto - Shooto
| 
| align=center| 5
| align=center| 3:00
| Tokyo, Japan
| 
|-
| Win
| align=center| 4-0-2
| Naoki Sakurada
| Decision
| Shooto - Shooto
| 
| align=center| 5
| align=center| 3:00
| Tokyo, Japan
| 
|-
| Win
| align=center| 3-0-2
| Yoshimasa Ishikawa
| Submission (rear-naked choke)
| Shooto - Shooto
| 
| align=center| 1
| align=center| 1:49
| Tokyo, Japan
| 
|-
| Draw
| align=center| 2-0-2
| Kenji Kawaguchi
| Draw
| Shooto - Shooto
| 
| align=center| 5
| align=center| 3:00
| Tokyo, Japan
| 
|-
| Win
| align=center| 2-0-1
| Yoshimasa Ishikawa
| Submission (kimura)
| Shooto - Shooto
| 
| align=center| 1
| align=center| 2:18
| Tokyo, Japan
| 
|-
| Win
| align=center| 1-0-1
| Yuji Ito
| Submission (armbar)
| Shooto - Shooto
| 
| align=center| 4
| align=center| 2:01
| Tokyo, Japan
| 
|-
| Draw
| align=center| 0-0-1
| Mitsuo Fujikura
| Draw
| Shooto - Shooto
| 
| align=center| 5
| align=center| 3:00
| Tokyo, Japan
|

Kickboxing record

|-  style="background:#FFBBBB;"
| 2001-6-3|| Loss ||align=left| Kunihide Onose || NKB || Tokyo, Japan || TKO (3 knockdown rule) || 3 || 1:52
|-  style="background:#FFBBBB;"
| 2001-3-25|| Loss ||align=left| Takahiro Seo || APKF || Yokohama, Japan || TKO (Low kick) || 4 || 0:36
|-  style="
| 1994-5-17|| - ||align=left| Yudai Watanabe || MAJKF || Tokyo, Japan || - || - || -
|-  style="background:#FFBBBB;"
| 1994-1-22|| Loss ||align=left| Adam Watt || MAJKF || Tokyo, Japan || KO || - || -
|-
|-
| colspan=9 | Legend:

See also
List of male mixed martial artists

References

External links
 
 Yasuto Sekishima at mixedmartialarts.com

Japanese male mixed martial artists
Welterweight mixed martial artists
Mixed martial artists utilizing shootfighting
Mixed martial artists utilizing shootboxing
Mixed martial artists utilizing shoot wrestling
Mixed martial artists utilizing catch wrestling
Living people
Year of birth missing (living people)